Nutana Suburban Development Area (SDA) is an area in Saskatoon, Saskatchewan (Canada). It is a part of the east side community of Saskatoon, and should not be confused with Nutana, one of the neighbourhoods within the Core Neighbourhoods SDA. It lies (generally) north of the outskirts of the City and the Rural Municipality of Corman Park No. 344, west of Lakewood SDA, south of the  Core Neighbourhoods SDA SDA and University Heights SDA, and east of the South Saskatchewan River and Confederation SDA.

Neighbourhoods 

The Nutana SDA contains two areas slated for expansion:
 Stonebridge projected for 2005
 The Willows projected for 2004

Recreation facilities
 Lathey Swimming Pool
 George Ward Swimming Pool

Shopping
 Grosvenor Park Shopping Center
 Stonegate Wal-Mart Big Box Shopping complex

See also
 List of shopping malls in Saskatoon
 Circle Center Mall
 Market Mall
 Midtown Plaza

Education 
Nutana SDA is home to the following schools:

Separate education

Secondary schools
 Holy Cross High School

Elementary schools
 George Vanier School
 Pope John Paul II School
 St. Frances School
 St. Matthew School
 St. Philip School
 Sion Catholic Middle School

Public education

Secondary schools
 Aden Bowman Collegiate
 Walter Murray Collegiate

Secondary Schools of Saskatoon

Elementary schools
 Alvin Buckwold School
 Buena Vista School
 Brevoort Park School
 Greystone Heights School
 Holliston School
 Hugh Cairns School
 John Lake School
 Prince Philip School
 Queen Elizabeth School

Special education
 John Dolan School

Defunct schools
 Albert School now a heritage site and community centre.
 Churchill School now the Saskatoon Full Gospel Church SFGC.
 Lorne Haselton school now the Saskatchewan Abilities Council
 Thornton School no longer exists.
 Victoria One Room School House heritage site on the U of S campus

Library
 Saskatoon Public Library J.S. Wood Library

Transportation

City transit

The following routes serve the area. There is a bus terminal at Market Mall where routes 1, 6 and 12 meet.
 1 Wildwood – Westview
 2 8th Street – 8th Street
 5 Briarwood – Fairhaven
 6 Broadway – Clarence
 11 Exhibition – Airport
 12 River Heights – Stonebridge
 13 Exhibition – Lawson
 50 Lakeview – Pacific Heights
 60 Lakeridge – Confederation

References

External links 
 City of Saskatoon · Departments · Community Services · City Planning · ZAM Maps
 Populace Spring 2006

Neighbourhoods in Saskatoon